Bezuidenhout Valley is a suburb of Johannesburg, South Africa. The area lies to the east of the Johannesburg CBD and is surrounded by the suburbs of Kensington to the south and Observatory to the north. It is located in Region E of the City of Johannesburg Metropolitan Municipality. It is colloquially known as the Bez Valley.

History
 The suburb is situated on part of an old Witwatersrand farm called Doornfontein. The farm Doornfontein was purchased in 1861 from B.P. Viljoen by Frederik Jacobus Bezuidenhout. Parts of the farm were sold from 1902 and the suburb stands from 1906. In March 1949, Willem Bezuidenhout sold the remaining land of 133ha to the Johannesburg City Council for use as a park and to be called Bezuidenhout Park.

References

Johannesburg Region F